Dragutin Topić (born 12 March 1971) is a Serbian former high jumper.

Biography
Topić is a world junior record holder with 2.37 m, which he set while winning the 1990 World Junior Championships, three weeks before his win at the senior European Championships. In the same year, Topić received the Golden Badge award for best athlete of Yugoslavia. Topić set five national records and claimed four Yugoslav national championships in the men's high jump event. He is a former member of AK Crvena zvezda, where he spent the majority of his career.

Topić competed until 2012, and had one of the longest careers in high-level high jump, since he holds not only world junior record with 2.37 m, but also world masters record for the ages over 35 (2.31 m, set in 2009), and over 40 years of age (2.28 m, set in 2012).

He competed at eight World Championships, and at six Olympic Games (between 1992 and 2012), which is an Olympic record for high jump, and he also shared the record for most appearances at the Olympics by a male track and field athlete with distance runner João N'Tyamba and race walker Jesús Ángel García, who later broke the record.

Personal bests

International competitions

Doping
On 2 February 2001, after a meeting in Wuppertal, Germany, he was tested and his urine sample showed the presence of norandrosterone in concentrations slightly higher than allowed. He was tested positive to norandrosterone and suspended for two years.

Personal life
His wife is Serbian former track and field athlete and national record holder in triple jump, Biljana Topić (née Mitrović), and he served as her coach while he was still an active competitor. Their daughter, Angelina Topić, won the high jump event at the 2022 European U18 Championships and also holds the national record in high jump, as well as equal world U18 best.

See also
Serbian records in athletics
List of junior world records in athletics
List of world records in masters athletics
List of doping cases in athletics

References

External links
 
 
 
 
  (archive)

1971 births
Living people
Athletes from Belgrade
Serbian male high jumpers
Serbia and Montenegro sportsmen
Yugoslav male high jumpers
Serbia and Montenegro athletes
Olympic athletes as Independent Olympic Participants
Athletes (track and field) at the 1992 Summer Olympics
Olympic athletes of Yugoslavia
Athletes (track and field) at the 1996 Summer Olympics
Olympic athletes of Serbia and Montenegro
Athletes (track and field) at the 2000 Summer Olympics
Athletes (track and field) at the 2004 Summer Olympics
Olympic athletes of Serbia
Athletes (track and field) at the 2008 Summer Olympics
Athletes (track and field) at the 2012 Summer Olympics
World Athletics Championships athletes for Yugoslavia
World Athletics Championships athletes for Serbia and Montenegro
World Athletics Championships athletes for Serbia
European Athletics Championships medalists
World record holders in masters athletics
Serbian masters athletes
Doping cases in athletics
Serbian sportspeople in doping cases
Mediterranean Games bronze medalists for Serbia
Athletes (track and field) at the 2009 Mediterranean Games
Universiade medalists in athletics (track and field)
Mediterranean Games medalists in athletics
Universiade gold medalists for Serbia and Montenegro
Medalists at the 1995 Summer Universiade